A workstation or work station may refer to:

 A computer or device, such as
computer workstation, a high-performance desktop computer (e.g., one with error-correcting memory), as may be designed for scientific or engineering applications, or
a music workstation
 A work space (usually for one employee); for example,
a cubicle or
a piece of furniture such as a computer desk.